Oscar Azarcón Solís (born October 13, 1953) is a Philippine-born prelate of the Roman Catholic Church and current bishop of the Diocese of Salt Lake City in Utah. Following a 20-month sede vacante, Solís was appointed by Pope Francis on January 10, 2017, and installed on March 7, 2017, after Solís' predecessor, John C. Wester, was appointed as Archbishop of Santa Fe. Solís was an auxiliary bishop for the Archdiocese of Los Angeles in California from 2003 to 2017.

Solís is the first Filipino-American to be consecrated a bishop and the first Asian American to lead a diocese.He speaks fluent English, Spanish, and Tagalog.

Biography

Early years 
The son of Antonia Azarcón and Anselmo dela Fuente Solís, Oscar Solís was born in San Jose City, Nueva Ecija in the Philippines  on October 13, 1953. He has three sisters and a brother, Ronald Solis, who is a Opus Dei priest in Hong Kong. Oscar Solis attended grade school at San Jose West Central School in San Jose and high school at Maria Assumpta Minor Seminary in Cabanatuan, Nueva Ecija. He studied philosophy at Christ the King Seminary in Quezon City and theology at the Pontifical Royal Seminary of the University of Santo Tomas in Manila. He also pursued studies in Asian religions and cultures.

Priesthood 
Solis was ordained a priest of the Diocese of Cabanatuan in the Philippines by Bishop Vicente Posada Reyes on April 28, 1979 in San Jose.Between 1979 and 1984, he served in his diocese as rector of the minor seminary, secretary of the priests senate, school chaplain, and director of vocations. 

Solis emigrated to the United States in 1984 and served for four years as parish vicar at Saint Rocco Parish in Union City, New Jersey, in the Diocese of Newark.He relocated to Louisiana and was incardinated in, or transferred to, the Diocese of Houma-Thibodaux on June 17, 1992. Solis held several parish posts in the diocese between 1988 and 2003, including rector of the St. Joseph Co-Cathedral Parish in Thibodaux, Louisiana.

Auxiliary Bishop of Los Angeles

On December 11, 2003, Pope John Paul II appointed Solis as titular bishop of Urci and as an auxiliary bishop of the Archdiocese of Los Angeles. He was consecrated bishop by Cardinal Roger Mahony at the Cathedral of our Lady of the Angels in Los Angelese on February 10, 2004. Solis said at the time that he was familiar with Spanish, but he was out of practice speaking it. 

In Los Angeles, Solis headed of a council focusing on minority issues as episcopal vicar for ethnic ministry from 2004 to 2009. He chaired and was later a member of the diocese Subcommittee on Asian and Pacific Affairs. He was an organizer of the first National Assembly of Filipino Priests in the U.S. in November 2011. He has held several positions with the United States Conference of Catholic Bishops.

Bishop of Salt Lake City
Pope Francis named Solis bishop of the Diocese of Salt Lake City on January 10, 2017, when the position had been vacant for 20 months. He was installed on March 7, 2017.

Solis has spoken on the Church of Jesus Christ of Latter-day Saints, the dominant faith in the diocese's territory, saying, "We value our long-standing relationship with The Church of Jesus Christ of Latter-day Saints. Our communities share a call to social justice and love for the poor. The task before us is one of building and strengthening our inclusive communities of faith. I look forward to continuing a culture of dialogue and encounter that leads us together to God.” Latter-day Saint Apostles M. Russell Ballard and D. Todd Christofferson spoke about Solis when he was installed as the bishop of Salt Lake City. Ballard said, “We look forward to partnering with Bishop Solis as we stand together and give witness to Jesus Christ as His disciples.” Christofferson added, “We celebrate the installation of Bishop Solis as the leader of the Diocese of Salt Lake City and the newest member of our faith community in Utah."

In 2018, Solis released the Pastoral Plan for the diocese. It focuses on developing a comprehensive vision for strengthening faith formation, promoting vocations to the priesthood and a universal call for holiness to the laity, seeking new ways to support the diocese financially and support the needy, increasing the reverence and devotion of the Eucharist, and upholding the dignity of all in society. Implementation of the plan began in 2018 and was to end in 2023.

See also

 Catholic Church hierarchy
 Catholic Church in the United States
 Historical list of the Catholic bishops of the United States
 List of Catholic bishops of the United States
 Lists of patriarchs, archbishops, and bishops

References

External links
 Roman Catholic Diocese of Salt Lake City Official Site

Episcopal succession

 

1953 births
20th-century American Roman Catholic priests
21st-century Roman Catholic bishops in the United States
Living people
People from Nueva Ecija
University of Santo Tomas alumni
Bishops appointed by Pope Francis